The following radio stations broadcast on AM frequency 550 kHz, which the Federal Communications Commission classifies as a regional frequency.

Argentina
 La Primera in Neuquén, Neuquén. (still have no call sign assigned)

Bolivia
 CP 153 in La Paz

Brazil
 ZYI-797 in Garanhuns
 ZYL-225 in Cataguazes
 ZYL-263 in Montes Claros
 ZYJ-331 in Curitiba
 ZYK-287 in Santa Cruz do Sul
 ZYK-578 in Cruzeiro
 ZYK-696 in Sertaozinho
 ZYK-902 in São Raimundo Nonato

Chile
 CD-055 in Angol

Colombia
 HJHF in Marinilla
 HJR22 in Santa Marta
 HJR36 in Mitú
 HJZQ in Neiva

Cuba
 CMBV in Wajay

El Salvador
 YSFG in Sonsonate

Guatemala (Channel 2)
 TGRV in San Pedro Sacatepéquez

Honduras
 HRH in Tegucigalpa

Jamaica
 RJR in Montego Bay

Ecuador
 HJHF in Maranilla
 HCGB1 in Quito

Mexico
 XEHLL-AM in Salina Cruz, Oaxaca
 XEPL-AM in Cd. Cuauhtémoc, Chihuahua
 XEGNAY-AM in Tepic, Nayarit

Nicaragua
 YNR1 in Chichigalpa

Paraguay
 ZP48 in Marical Estigarribia
 ZP 16 in Ciudad del Este

Saint Kitts and Nevis
 ZIZ in Springfield, Basseterre (Note: ZIZ operates at 555 kHz)

United Kingdom

Falkland Islands
 VPC in Port Stanley

United States

Uruguay
 CW1 in Colonia del Sacramento

Venezuela
 YVKE in Caracas

External links

 FCC list of radio stations on 550 kHz

References

Lists of radio stations by frequency